Rachanon Kanyathong is a Thai professional footballer who plays as a  defender for Thai League 2 club  Suphanburi.

References

External links
 Goal.com 
 ballthaifc.com
 

1992 births
Living people
Rachanon Kanyathong
Rachanon Kanyathong
Association football defenders
Rachanon Kanyathong
Rachanon Kanyathong
Rachanon Kanyathong
Rachanon Kanyathong
Rachanon Kanyathong
Rachanon Kanyathong